The Tramway of Quend-Plage and Fort-Mahon ( or ) was a  long  gauge railway line, which operated from 1898-1914 and 1921-1934.

History  

The tramway was inaugurated in 1898. A single journey from Quend-Fort-Mahon to Quend-Plage lasted 30 min, and to Fort-Mahon-Plage it lasted 40 min.

The tramway was re-commissioned on 13 Juli 1921. The tramway was used until May 1932 and formally closed on 26. February 1934.

Rolling stock

Locomotives

Carriages 
Initially, two open Decauville summer cars, one Decauville saloon car and three V-skip trucks were used.

Remarks

References 

Decauville
Railway lines in Hauts-de-France
Tram transport in France
Railway lines opened in 1898
Railway lines closed in 1934